Wran or WRAN may refer to:

 Neville Wran, 35th Premier of New South Wales and ALP President
Thomas Wran, English-born architectural sculptor in Sydney, Australia
 WRAN (FM), a radio station (97.3 FM) licensed to Taylorville, Illinois, United States
 WSVZ, a radio station (98.3 FM) licensed to Tower Hill, Illinois, United States that held the WRAN call sign from 1997 to 2014
 WRAN-LP, a defunct low-power radio station (100.1 FM) formerly licensed to Randolph, Vermont, United States
 IEEE 802.22, a standard for Wireless Regional Area Network (WRAN) using white spaces in the TV frequency spectrum

See also
Women's Royal Australian Naval Service (WRANS), a non-combat branch of the Royal Australian Navy that recruited women